Leonardo Tocco was the name of several members of the medieval and modern Italian Tocco family. It may refer to:

 Leonardo I Tocco (?–1375/1377), Count Palatine of Cephalonia and Zakynthos
 Leonardo II Tocco (1374/1377–1429), Lord of Zakynthos
 Leonardo III Tocco ( 1436–1503), Despot of Epirus
 Leonardo IV Tocco ( 1510–1564), Titular Despot of Epirus
 Leonardo V Tocco (1591–1641), Titular Despot of Epirus
 Leonardo VI Tocco (?–1670), son of Antonio Tocco
 Leonardo VII Tocco (1698–1776), Titular Prince of Achaea